= Liberata Masoliver =

Spanish novelist (1911–1996)

Liberata Masoliver (1911–1996) was a Spanish novelist who wrote extensively during the period of the Francoist State from the perspective of a conservative ideology. The themes of her work include the Spanish Civil War, the Spanish colonial experience in Equatorial Guinea and Ethiopia, and life in Francoist Spain.

== Bibliography ==
Her books include

- Efún (1955)
- Los Galiano (1957)
- Selva negra, selva verde (1959)
- El rebelde (1960)
- La bruixa (1961)
- Barcelona en llamas (1961)
- La mujer del colonial (1962)
- Maestro albañil (1963)
- Pecan los buenos (1964)
- Nieve y alquitrán (1965)
- Un camino Ilega a la cumbre (1966)
- La retirada (1967)
- Casino Veraniego (1968)
- Hombre de paz (1969)
- Telón (1969)
- Dios con nosotros (1970)
- Estés donde estés (1972)
- Los mini-amores de Angelines (1972)
